Acanthomysis brucei is a species of mysid. It was first described in 2002 by the Japanese marine biologists Kouki Fukuoka and Masaaki Murano.

It is an omnivore and a suspension feeder, which moves by flipping its tail, and is found in the Andaman Sea at the bottom of the water column.

References

Mysida
Crustaceans described in 2002